Barren Island or Barren Islands may refer to:

Books 

 Baren Island by Carol Zoref

Geography

Australia 
 Barren Island (Tasmania)
 Cape Barren Island, Tasmania

Canada 
 Barren Island, Newfoundland and Labrador
 Barren Island (Nova Scotia)
 Barren Island (Ontario)

Falkland Islands 
 Barren Island (Falkland Islands)

India 
 Barren Island (Andaman Islands)

Madagascar 
 Barren Isles (Nosy Barren) Melaky region

United States 
 Barren Islands, Alaska
 Barren Island, Brooklyn, New York
 Barren Island (Hudson River), New York
 Barren Island (Maryland)
 Barren Island in Palmyra Atoll, US Minor Outlying Islands
 Barren Island (Washington)